The Gusi Peace Prize is a private award given by the Gusi Peace Prize Foundation, based in Manila, Philippines. The Gusi Peace Prize is given to recognize individuals and organizations who contribute to global peace and progress through a wide variety of fields.

The awards ceremonies are held yearly at Philippine International Convention Center (Manila, Philippines) on the fourth Wednesday of November.

Mandate
The Gusi Peace Prize is referred to in Presidential Proclamation No. 1476 signed by President of the Philippines Gloria Macapagal Arroyo on 17 March 2008, declaring every fourth Wednesday of November as "Gusi Peace Prize International Friendship Day".

Legacy
This Gusi Peace Prize was founded by its now chairman, Mr. Barry Gusi in 2002. The reason behind establishment of this peace award was to continue the ancestral legacy, as well as, to pay special tribute to Captain Gemeniano Javier Gusi (World War II Guerilla Warrior) who subsequently became a politician and a human rights activist in the Philippines. His work was subsequently supported and continued by his spouse, Madame Teodora Sotejo Gusi who established and moderated many charitable projects to help the persons in need (including abused children and wives, sick and unemployed persons, humiliated individuals etc.) throughout the Philippines.

Background
The Gusi Peace Prize Foundation is a charitable (non-profit) and secular organization. It is registered with the Securities and Exchange Commission (Philippines). The foundation recognizes the achievements of various individuals in a wide range of fields (including human rights, peace, communal harmony, health, education, culture, politics and humanity). Being one of the foremost peace awards of Asia, Gusi Peace Prize is often referred as "Nobel Peace Prize of the East".

Nomination process
Gusi Peace Prize Foundation receives more than 1000 proposals every year; however, the 13-member committee (with international jury members from Asia, Europe, Australia and United States) selects only 15 winners. As per the complex and rigorous criteria, all proposed nominations should be endorsed by their relevant organizations/ local ministries who can subsequently certify the worth and achievements of nominees. The final list of winners also require approval of the Senate of the Philippines.

Award ceremony
The ceremony consists of a series of pre-award sessions and post-award events which include an official gathering of all laureates in military wreath laying parade at Rizal Park (Ermita), followed by a visit to Manila City Hall for handing-over the Golden Key of Manila by Mayor of Manila, a courtesy call to the President of the Philippines at the Malacañang Palace, folk music and cultural dance performances, press conference at National Press Club (Manila), and farewell programme at Tagaytay city etc. The final award ceremony is held at Philippine International Convention Center (Manila, Philippines) on the fourth Wednesday of November which is being attended by an average crowd of 5,000 guests comprising representatives of the diplomatic corporations, local and foreign politicians, business leaders, celebrities, philanthropists, scientists and other prominent figures from the Philippines and the rest of Asia, as well as the other continents.

Controversy
Politician and professional boxer Manny Pacquiao was shortlisted for the Prize in 2009; but was replaced with singer and actress Lea Salonga. According to the criteria designed by the Gusi Peace Prize Foundation, the awardees have to be present in the award ceremony to personally receive the prize; however, instead of joining the event, Pacquiao nominated his Canadian adviser, Michael Koncz to receive the prize on his behalf. By following the "No Showing Up - No Award" policy, the chairman of the foundation not only revoked the nomination of Manny Pacquiao but also blacklisted him from all future award shows.

References

External links 
 

Peace awards
Philippine awards